Nkonya is a Guang language spoken by the people of Nkonya in the Biakoye District of the Oti Region of Ghana. A phonology and a dictionary are available.

References

Sources
 Brigitte Reineke: The structure of the Nkonya language. Verlag Enzyklopädie, Leipzig 1972.

Guang languages
Languages of Ghana